Tangi Sar (also Romanized as Tangī Sar and Tangīsar; also known as Tangeh Sar) is a village in Gavrud Rural District, Muchesh District, Kamyaran County, Kurdistan Province, Iran. At the 2006 census, its population was 1,412, in 356 families. The village is populated by Kurds.

References 

Towns and villages in Kamyaran County
Kurdish settlements in Kurdistan Province